The discography of Fresno, a Brazilian emo band, consists of seven studio albums, one live albums, two video albums and nine singles.

In 2001 they released her first EP album, and between 2003 and 2010 released seven studio albums.

The band already has nine singles released, and the most famous is Pólo.

Albums

Studio albums

Notes
 These albums did not reach any of the charts in Brazil.

Live albums

Extended plays

Singles

Video albums

Music videos 
 Stonehenge (2003)
 Onde Está (Where is?) (2004)
 Onde Está (Version 2) (Where Is?) (2005)
 Quebre As Correntes (Break The Chains) (2006)
 Alguém Que Te Faz Sorrir (Someone That Makes You Smile) (2006)
 Polo (2007)
 Uma Música (A Song) (2008)
 Alguém Que Te Faz Sorrir (Redenção Version) (Someone That Makes You Smile) (2008)
 Desde Quando Você Se Foi (Since You've Been Gone) (2009)
 Deixa o Tempo (Let The Time) (2010)

References

External links
Fresno's official website
Fresno's official MySpace

Rock music group discographies
Discography
Discographies of Brazilian artists
Latin music discographies